Adherents of Islam constitute the world's second largest religious group. A projection by the PEW suggests that Muslims numbered approximately 1.9 billion followers in 2020. Studies in the 21st century suggest that, in terms of percentage and worldwide spread, Islam is the fastest-growing major religion in the world, mostly because Muslims have more children than other major religious groups. Most Muslims are either of two denominations: Sunni (87–90%, roughly 1.7 billion people) or Shia (10–13%, roughly 180–230 million people). Islam is the majority religion in several subregions: Central Asia, West Asia, North Africa, West Africa, the Sahel, and the Middle East. The diverse Asia-Pacific region contains the highest number of Muslims in the world, easily surpassing the combined Middle East and North Africa.

South Asia has the largest population of Muslims in the world, with about one-third of all Muslims being from South Asia. Islam is the dominant religion in the Maldives, Afghanistan, Pakistan, and Bangladesh. India is the country with the largest Muslim population outside Muslim-majority countries with more than 200 million adherents.

The various Hamito-Semitic, Arab, Berber, Turkic, and Iranic countries of the greater Middle East-North Africa (MENA) region, where Islam is the dominant religion in every country other than Israel, host 23% of the world's Muslims.

The country with the single largest population of Muslims is Indonesia in Southeast Asia, which on its own hosts 13% of the world's Muslims. Together, the Muslims in the countries of Southeast Asia constitute the world's third-largest population of Muslims. In the countries of the Malay Archipelago, Muslims are in the majority in Malaysia (East Malaysia), Indonesia and Brunei.

About 15% of Muslims reside in Sub-Saharan Africa, and sizeable Muslim communities are also found in the Americas, Russia, China and Europe.

Western Europe hosts many Muslim immigrant communities where Islam is the second-largest religion after Christianity, where it represents 6% of the total population or 24 million people.

According to the Pew Research Center in 2010, there were 50 Muslim-majority countries. Around 62% of the world's Muslims live in the Asia-Pacific region (from Turkey to Indonesia), with over one billion adherents. The largest Muslim population in a country is in Indonesia, a country home to 12.7% of the world's Muslims, followed by Pakistan (11.1%), India (10.9%) and Bangladesh (9.2%).
About 20% of Muslims live in the Arab world. In the Middle East, the non-Arab countries of Iran and Turkey are the largest Muslim-majority countries, while Egypt and Nigeria in Africa have the same status.  The study found more Muslims in the United Kingdom or France than in Lebanon and more in Russia or China than in Syria. Also, Ethiopia has more Muslims than Afghanistan. The Indian state of Uttar Pradesh has more Muslims than any other Muslim-majority countries except Indonesia, Pakistan, Bangladesh, Nigeria, Egypt, Iran and Turkey.

Denominations

Islam is divided into two major denominations, Sunni and Shi'a. Of the total Muslim population, 87–90% are Sunni and 10–13% are Shi'a. Most Shi'as (between 68% and 80%) live in mainly four countries: Iran, Azerbaijan, Bahrain, and Iraq. Furthermore, there are concentrated Shi'a populations in Lebanon, Russia, China, Pakistan, Bangladesh and 10 sub-Saharan African countries.
The major surviving Imamah-Muslim Sects are Usulism (with around 8.5% of the total Muslim population), Nizari Ismailism (with around 1%) and Alevism (with slightly more than 0.5% but less than 1%). The other existing groups include Zaydi Shi'a of Yemen whose population is around 0.5% of the world's Muslim population, Musta’li Ismaili  (with nearly 0.1% whose Taiyabi adherents reside in Sindh and Gujarat in South Asia. There are also significant diaspora populations in Europe, North America, the Far East, and East Africa), and Ibadis from the Kharijites whose population has diminished to a level below 0.15%. (with around 1%), non-denominational Muslims, Quranist Muslims and Wahhabis (with around 1–2% of the world's total Muslim population) also exist.

A study from the Pew Research Center in 2012 found that many Muslims (one out of five in 22 Muslim majority countries) identify as non-denominational or "Just a Muslim". This non-denominational affiliation is most common in Southern and Eastern Europe as well as Central Asia, with minority populations in Southeast Asia and sub-Saharan Africa. The study found that a median percentage of 74% of Muslims in Kazakhstan, 65% in Albania, 64% in Kyrgyzstan, 56% in Indonesia, 55% in Mali, and 40% in Cameroon identify this way. However, it is much less common in parts of Africa, the Middle East, and South Asia.

Countries

Most of the percentages of Muslim populations of each country, if not stated otherwise, were taken from the study by the Pew Research Center report of 5 facts about the Muslim population in Europe, 2017.

Table

Continents

Table

Projected demographic changes

A Pew Research Study in 2015 found that the Muslim population was expected to grow twice as fast (70%) as the world population by 2060 (1.8 billion in 2015 to 3 billion by 2060). This expected growth is much larger than any other religious group. Muslims are likely to constitute roughly 26.3% of the world's total population by 2030. This expected growth is attributed to Muslim families generally having more children as well as the fact that the Muslim population has the youngest median age of any religion. Furthermore, increased healthcare conditions in Muslim majority countries are currently increasing life expectancy and decreasing child mortality, which, if trends continue this way, will also contribute to the growth of the Muslim population more than any other religious group. These trends are not for every region, however. In fact, Muslim population growth is expected to slow down in Asia (including the Middle East) and Africa,  due to lower birth rates.

The largest Muslim population growths are expected to be in the Middle East and Africa. Furthermore, Pakistan is projected to be the country with the largest Muslim population by 2030. Muslims are expected to grow to 8% (52.8 million) of the total population of Europe, and this growth is expected to be the largest in the western European countries. Russia will have the largest total population of Muslims in Europe, however. Most of these changes are expected to come from immigration.

In the Americas, Canada’s Muslim population is expected to increase to 6.6%  and United States' to 2% by 2030.  These increases, much like Europe, are expected to be driven mainly by immigration.

See also

Islam:
 Muslim world
 Outline of Islam
 Glossary of Islam
 Ahmadiyya by country
 Muslim population growth
 Index of Islam-related articles
 Shia Muslims in the Arab world
 Organisation of Islamic Cooperation

Religions by country:
 Religions by country

General
 List of religious populations

Related
 Islam in Bangladesh
 Islam in China
 Islam in Indonesia
 Islam in Iran
 Islam in Nigeria
 Islam in Pakistan
 Islam in the Philippines
 Islam in Russia

References

Further reading
 United States Department of State International Religious Freedom Report
 CIA World Factbook The World Factbook 
 Religious Freedom page
 Religious Intelligence
Muslim Population Percentage from U.S Dept. of State
 CIA World Factbook Religions
 BBC News Muslims in Europe: Country guide

External links
 Official website of the Pew Forum study on Global Muslim Population
 Muslim Population-A Site with Extensive information regarding worldwide Muslim population